Gloria C. Vaughn (June 25, 1936 – December 12, 2020) was an American politician who was a Republican member of the New Mexico House of Representatives from 1995 to 2010. Vaughn attended Del Mar College and the Salvation Army College and was later a minister in the Salvation Army as well as a religious education director at Holloman Air Force Base.

Vaughn died in 2020.

References

1936 births
2020 deaths
People from Corpus Christi, Texas
People from Alamogordo, New Mexico
Del Mar College alumni
Salvation Army officers
Women state legislators in New Mexico
Republican Party members of the New Mexico House of Representatives